Banie is the main island of the Vanikoro group, in the Temotu province of the Solomon Islands. The only other inhabited island of the group is the smaller island of Teanu or Tevai.

Name
The island of Banie receives its name from its highest mountain, mount Banie.

The local population sometimes uses Banie as a way to designate the whole Vanikoro group.

References

External links
 Maps of Vanikoro, showing location of Banie.

Islands of the Solomon Islands